Koeleria macrantha is a species of grass known by the common name prairie Junegrass in North America and crested hair-grass in the UK. It is widespread across much of Eurasia and North America. It occurs in many habitat types, especially prairie.

Description
The inflorescence is nearly cylindrical and may taper somewhat toward the tip. It holds shiny tan spikelets which are sometimes tinted with purple, each about half a centimeter long. Its fruit is a grain that breaks once it has fully ripened.

It is a good forage for many types of grazing animals. It is classified as a severe allergen in humans with grass allergy.

Growing conditions and habitat
Koeleria macrantha is a plant that prefers cooler seasons such as early spring or fall. It grows mostly in rocky or sandy, well-drained areas within forests or plains. It prefers more direct sunlight over partially shaded areas. It has the ability to grow in elevations as high as 2480 meters and as low as 121 meters above sea level.

Gardens
Koeleria macrantha is used as an exceptionally low-maintenance lawn and turf grass. It is not suitable for high-traffic use due to its slow growth rate. It is often used for golf course roughs.

Wildlife and farming significance
Koeleria macrantha is one of many dietary staples for all classes of livestock and several species of various prairie wildlife depending on the stage of its seasonal development. It provides a stable source of nourishment for livestock in early spring and has been utilized by several species of deer, elk, and sheep for a food source due to its ability to grow in remote areas where the environment is not suited for other plant life. Due to the fact that it grows in scattered areas, it has not become a large dietary staple for much wildlife but still provides moderate nourishment to prairie wildlife. It has been found to be palatable to all livestock and wildlife in its post-curing stage in spring and fall but the palatability drops for most species when seed production begins before curing.

Koeleria marcrantha spreads slowly via seed distribution. It will spread into bordering plant communities over time as an invasive species. A number of insects feed on K. macrantha, including the striped flea beetle (Phyllotreta striolata) which feeds on the roots and foliage.

Wildfire protection
Koeleria macrantha has been implemented in several areas of frequent wildfires due to its fire-resistant qualities. Due to its small size and the coarse leaves, they burn faster and transfer a very small amount of heat to the soil below. It also usually grows in small groups, which limits the amount of damage it can do once it burns. Although this species varies on its impact on fighting wildfires depending on the environment it grows in and the state of the plant, it provides a much needed damper for controlling the fire once it has begun.

Various other uses in society

Food
The seed can be ground down into a powder then can be boiled in water, like a porridge, or made into flour or bread.

Material
The leaves of the plant can be woven together to make brooms or brushes. Long stalks of the plant can be strung together with other plant fiber or string to be used for cleaning pots and pans. It has also been used as a building material when mixed with adobe for its adhesive qualities and strength.

References

External links
Jepson Manual Treatment - Koeleria macrantha
Calphoto, University of California, Koeleria macrantha - Photo gallery

Pooideae
Bunchgrasses of North America
Flora of Europe
Flora of Asia
Flora of North America
Grasses of Mexico
Grasses of the United States
Grasses of Canada
Garden plants of North America
Drought-tolerant plants
Lawn grasses